Hugh Pat Floyd (1910-1988) was an English boxer who competed for England.

Boxing career
Floyd won a gold medal in the heavyweight division at the 1934 British Empire Games in London.

Floyd was the Amateur Boxing Association four times heavyweight champion in 1929, 1934, 1935 and 1946. He defeated James Howell of the United States in the New York Golden Gloves tournament during 1935. On 8 December 1935 in the Oslo Colosseum; he fought Erling Nilsen in England's first match against Norway. He represented England in the 1934 European Championships in Budapest.

Personal life
He was a printer by trade and lived at 45 Kerby Street, Battersea in 1935.

References

1910 births
1988 deaths
English male boxers
Commonwealth Games gold medallists for England
Commonwealth Games medallists in boxing
Boxers at the 1934 British Empire Games
Heavyweight boxers
Medallists at the 1934 British Empire Games